Hou Sheng-mao is a Taiwanese physician and politician. He was the Minister of Department of Health from 2005 to 2008.

Education
Hou obtained his doctoral degree in clinical medicine from National Taiwan University (NTU).

Early career
Hou was the vice superintendent of National Taiwan University Hospital, and director and professor of the School of Medicine of NTU.

Department of Health
The nomination of Hou was announced by Premier Frank Hsieh in February 2005.

References

1950 births
Living people
Taiwanese Ministers of Health and Welfare
21st-century Taiwanese politicians
Taiwanese hospital administrators